Imperialism in Asia may refer to:
empires in Asia, see List of empires
Achaemenid Empire
Chinese Empire
Japanese Empire
Maurya Empire
Mongol Empire
Mughal Empire
Ottoman Empire
Sasanian Empire
Western imperialism in Asia

See also
Gunpowder empires